Imperfectly is the third studio album by singer-songwriter Ani DiFranco, released in 1992 (see 1992 in music).

Track listing

Personnel
Ani DiFranco – guitar, vocals, production
Andy Stochansky – drums, percussion
Geoff Perry – bass
George Puleo – electric guitar
Greg Horn – trumpet
Tim Allan — mandolin
Mary Ramsey — viola

Production
Ani DiFranco – record producer
Ed Stone – producer, mastering, engineer
Tony Romano – engineer
Scot Fisher – photography

References

Ani DiFranco albums
1992 albums
Righteous Babe Records albums